Ronald G. Hayes (February 26, 1929 – October 1, 2004) was an American television actor who, as an activist in the environmental movement, worked for the establishment of the first Earth Day, observed on April 22, 1970. He was a member of the Sierra Club and a founder of the ecological interest group Wilderness World.

On television, Hayes guest starred in Bat Masterson, in a recurring role as Wyatt Earp (1959 to 1961) and again as Jeremy French (1960). Hayes was a regularly seen face, in various characters showing a wide range of acting skill, on Gunsmoke (TV series). He also played a blinded U.S. Army captain in an episode of Don't Call Me Charlie! (1962), and he also co-starred in the ABC Western comedy The Rounders (1966) and portrayed Lincoln Vail in the syndicated adventure series The Everglades (1961). Hayes also guest starred in one episode of the High Chaparral and two episodes of Death Valley Days as the Editor of the newspaper reporting Custer's Last Stand and the Devil's Bar.

Television roles

 Cheyenne as "Durango Kid" (1957) in "Town of Fear" (S3E6)
 Tombstone Territory as outlaw “Chick Umbir” (1959) in "The Day of Amnesty" (S2E4)
 Bat Masterson as "Jeremy French" (1960) and in a recurring role as Wyatt Earp (1959-1961)
 The Virginian as Marshall "Brett Cole" (1963-S2E13)
 Gunsmoke as “Jud” (1963-S8E28)
 ''Bonanza (TV series) as "Jarred" (1966) in "Bridesgroom" (S8E13)

See also

References

External links

1929 births
2004 deaths
American male television actors
Male actors from San Francisco
People from Greater Los Angeles
Stanford University alumni
United States Marine Corps personnel of the Korean War
United States Marines
Activists from California
Sierra Club people
Accidental deaths from falls
Accidental deaths in California
Western (genre) television actors
20th-century American male actors